Edward Lowenstein (died 1970) was an American architect known for his modernist home designs in Greensboro, North Carolina and as an educator and employer of architects Black, white, male, and female. Lowenstein was born in Chicago and went to Deerfield-Shields High School.   He graduated from MIT in 1935.

He married Frances Stern.

African American architects who worked for him early in their careers include William Gupple, Willie Edward Jenkins, and Clinton Gravely. He also taught architecture including design of buildings on campus, to female college students at Woman's College (now UNC-Greensboro).

Work
Greensboro Public Library (1964)
Dudley High School Gym
Lowenstein Levy home on Granville Rd.
Cone house at 910 Sunset Dr.

Further reading
Modernism at Home: Edward Loewenstein’s Mid-Century Architectural Innovation in the Civil Rights Era by Patrick Lee Lewis

References

1970 deaths
Architects from North Carolina
People from Greensboro, North Carolina
MIT School of Architecture and Planning alumni
Modernist architects from the United States
University of North Carolina faculty
Architects from Chicago
20th-century American architects